Michael Alan Burton (born 18 December 1945, in Maidenhead) is a former English rugby union footballer, who won a reputation as an uncompromising prop forward for Gloucester, England and the British and Irish Lions.

Club career 

Burton arrived at Kingsholm from the local club Longlevens RFC and made his debut in the Gloucester front row at the age of 18 on 14 November 1964. He went on to make 366 appearances before retiring in 1978.
 
He was captain of Gloucester in the 1975 season and played 50 times at provincial level for Gloucestershire including 39 appearances in the County Championship, winning it four times and leading the county pack in a crushing 62-10 victory over Japan at Kingsholm in September 1976. It was with Gloucestershire that he made his third tour of South Africa in the same year.

He won the RFU National Cup (then the John Player Cup) with Gloucester at Twickenham in 1972 against Moseley and again in 1978 against Leicester.
 
In between those important championship wins, in 1977 Burton was honoured with an invitation to play for a "World XV" at the Parc des Princes stadium in Paris against the Grand Slam champions France.       
 
The World XV was assembled to celebrate the 75th Anniversary of the Federation Francaise de Rugby and Burton was one of only three English international players included. The others were hooker Peter Wheeler and Number 8 Andy Ripley.       
 
In October 1972, Burton scored a famous try for the Western Counties against the touring All Blacks at Kingsholm and played for the same regional team in the 15–14 win over Australia at Bath a year later.

Burton was also a member of the Gloucester squad that toured the US in 1977 and returned home with an unblemished record.

International career 

Burton made his England debut in 1972 against Wales and toured South Africa for the first time with an undefeated England side that year as a member of the test team that beat the Springboks 18-9 at Ellis Park.

A broken leg, sustained during an England training session at Twickenham in November 1972, saw him miss the autumn international against the All Blacks and the Five Nations matches in the early part of 1973 but he fought his way back to fitness and recovered well enough to be included in the England squad to tour Fiji and New Zealand later that year.

He toured Australia with England in 1975 where he became the first Englishman to be sent off at international level.

In the second Test against Australia ("The Battle of Brisbane") Burton was sensationally dismissed after just three minutes by local Queensland referee Bob Burnett for a late tackle on the Australian winger Doug Osborne.

In 1974 Burton toured South Africa for a second time, this time as a member of Willie John McBride's invincible British and Irish Lions team. He played 28 times for England in all, 17 times in Tests, and represented the Barbarians on eight occasions.

Post career 

After retiring from rugby, Burton became a successful businessman in the field of corporate hospitality, specialist sports travel and player representation. His business interests took him around the world and he had a short spell playing recreational rugby in Canada for Toronto Lions.

He gave a great deal back to the game in later years by dedicating his time and business experience to the Barbarian FC as an influential member of the club's management board and also serving on the Board of Governors at Gloucester's successful rugby nursery Hartpury College.

External links
 http://www.mikeburton.com/
 http://www.lionstour.com/
 http://www.englandrugbytravel.com/
 http://www.sporting-heroes.net/rugby-heroes/displayhero.asp?HeroID=453
 http://www.sporting-heroes.net/rugby-heroes/displayhero.asp?HeroID=1602
 http://en.espn.co.uk/timeline/rugby/player/7873.html
 http://www.barbarianfc.co.uk

1945 births
Living people
Barbarian F.C. players
British & Irish Lions rugby union players from England
England international rugby union players
English rugby union players
Gloucester Rugby players
Gloucestershire County RFU players
Rugby union players from Maidenhead
Rugby union props